Kim Hyun-woo (born 17 April 1989) is a South Korean footballer who plays as a forward, most recently for Terengganu FA in Malaysia Super League.

Club career
He joined Seongnam Ilhwa Chunma in 2012. He made his league debut in the match against Daejeon Citizen on 4 April 2012. On 1 July 2016, he signed a contract with six times Cambodian League's champion Phnom Penh Crown.

In June 2017, Hyun-woo signed a 5-months contract with PKNP F.C., a club in the Malaysia Premier League.

In December 2017, Hyun-woo signed a 1-year contract with Malaysia Super League team Terengganu F.C. I. But Hyun-woo sustained an injury in January 2018 during a training session, and were sidelined from the team for at least 6 months.

References

External links 

1989 births
Living people
Association football forwards
South Korean footballers
Seongnam FC players
K League 1 players
Expatriate footballers in Cambodia
Phnom Penh Crown FC players
South Korean expatriates in Cambodia
Expatriate footballers in Myanmar
Association football midfielders
Footballers from Seoul